Jean-Paul Steven Adela (born 28 March 1987) is a Seychellois footballer, who plays for La Passe FC.

References

External links
 
 

1987 births

Living people
Seychellois footballers
Seychelles international footballers
La Passe FC players
Association football defenders